A Black doll is a doll of a black person. Black doll manufacture dates back to the 19th century, with representations being both realistic and stereotypical. More accurate, mass-produced depictions are manufactured today as toys and adult collectibles.

European manufacture

Several 19th-century European doll companies preceded American doll companies in manufacturing Black dolls. These predecessors include Carl Bergner of Germany, who made a three-faced doll with one face a crying Black child and the other two, happier white faces.  In 1892, Jumeau of Paris advertised Black and mixed-race dolls with bisque heads. Gebruder Heubach of Germany made character faces in bisque. Other European doll makers include Bru Jne. & Cie and Société Française de Fabrication de Bébés et Jouets (S.F.B.J.) of France, and Kestner and Steiner of Germany.

American manufacture

American entrepreneur Richard Henry Boyd founded the National Negro Doll Company in 1911 "after he tried to purchase dolls for his children but could find none that were not gross caricatures of African Americans."

American companies began including Black dolls in their doll lines in the early 1900s. Between 1910 and 1930, Horsman, Vogue, and Madame Alexander included Black dolls in their doll lines. Gradually, other American companies followed suit.

In 1947, the first African American woman cartoonist Jackie Ormes created the Patty-Jo doll, which was based on Patty-Jo 'n Ginger, the cartoon panel she penned for newspapers at the time. The doll was a realistic Black doll, breaking the mammy doll stereotype.

Beatrice Wright Brewington, an African American entrepreneur, founded B. Wright's Toy Company, Inc. and mass-produced Black dolls with ethnically-correct features. Also an educator, Wright began instructing girls in the art of making dolls in 1955.

During the 1960s and in the aftermath of the Watts Riots in Los Angeles, California, Shindana Toys, a Division of Operation Bootstrap, Inc., is credited as the first major doll company to mass-produce ethnically correct Black dolls in the United States.

Other popular collectible Black dolls include manufactured play dolls past and current, manufactured dolls designed for collectors by companies such as Madame Alexander and Tonner Doll, artist dolls, one-of-a-kind dolls, portrait dolls and those representing historical figures, reborn dolls, and paper dolls. In addition, American Girl has also released Black dolls portraying girls of color from various points in American history such as Addy Walker and civil rights-era Melody Ellison, as well as those from the present day. 

Mattel Toys created the first Black dolls in the popular Barbie line, Francie and Christie, in 1967 and 1969 respectively. This caused controversy at the time they were released.

Black Doll Museums
The Philadelphia Doll Museum was founded in 1988 by Barbara Whiteman. While the museum was open, roughly 1,000 Black dolls were on view.  The Philadelphia Doll Museum is now closed.

To honor the history of Black dolls, in 2012, three sisters named Debra Britt, Felicia Walker, and Tamara Mattison opened the National Black Doll Museum of History and Culture in Mansfield, Massachusetts. While open to the public, it featured over 6,000 Black dolls and its mission is to continue to nurture the self-esteem of children and preserve the legacy of Black dolls.

In January 2021, Black-doll collector, historian, and author on the subject of black dolls, Debbie Behan Garrett founded DeeBeeGee's Virtual Black Doll Museum, "the first and only virtual Black doll museum where antique, vintage, modern, and one-of-a-kind Black dolls are celebrated 24/7."

See also
 African American culture
 Golliwog
 Topsy-Turvy doll
 Philadelphia Doll Museum

Black Doll Reference Books
Collector's Encyclopedia of Black Dolls by Patiki Gibbs, Collector Books, 1986
Black Dolls an Identification and Value Guide 1820-1991 by Myla Perkins, Collector Books, 1991
Black Dolls an Identification and Value Guide Book II by Myla Perkins, Collector Books, 1995
The Definitive Guide to Collecting Black Dolls by Debbie Behan Garrett, Hobby House Press, 2003
Black Dolls Proud, Bold & Beautiful by Nayda Rondon, Reverie Press, 2004
Collectible African American Dolls Identification and Values by Yvonne Ellis, Collector Books, 2008
Black Dolls: A Comprehensive Guide to Celebrating Collecting and Experiencing the Passion by Debbie Behan Garrett, 2008
 "The Scripts of Black Dolls" in Racial Innocence: Performing American Childhood from Slavery to Civil Rights, by Robin Bernstein, 2011
 See also Robin Bernstein, Children's Books, Dolls, and the Performance of Race; or, The Possibility of Children's Literature, PMLA 126.1 (2011): 160-169.

References

External links
 Baby doll, Acme Toy Company, ca. 1925, in the Staten Island Historical Society Online Collections Database

Dolls
African-American culture
Stereotypes of African Americans